Alicia Kopf is the pseudonym of Imma Ávalos Marqués (born 1982 in Gerona, Spain), a Spanish author and artist based in Barcelona.

Kopf is interested in the concept of exploration, particularly polar exploration, which is visible throughout her work both as an artist and an author. Her debut novel, Brother in Ice, was published in the English translation (trans. Mara Faye Lethem) by And Other Stories in 2018.

She currently works at the Open University of Catalonia as a lecturer in Communications.

Novels 

 Hermano de hielo, 2016; Brother in Ice (trans. Mara Faye Lethem), And Other Stories, 2018.

Awards 

 (2015) Documenta de Narrativa Prize, for Hermano de hielo.
 (2016) Libreter Prize, for Hermano de hielo
 (2016) Critical Eye Award (Ojo Crítico), for Hermano de hielo

References

External links
 The Rumpus Mini-Interview Project #140: Alicia Kopf
 

1982 births
Living people
Spanish women novelists
21st-century Spanish novelists
Date of birth missing (living people)
Writers from Barcelona
People from Girona
20th-century pseudonymous writers
Pseudonymous women writers